The Amani Coalition was a political party alliance in Kenya.

History
The alliance was established to support the candidacy of Musalia Mudavadi in the 2013 general elections. Its members were the United Democratic Forum Party (UDF), KANU and New Ford Kenya.

References

Kenya African National Union
Defunct political party alliances in Kenya